Mahir Iftić (born 17 March 1980) is a Bosnian-Herzegovinian retired footballer who played as a defender.

Club career
Iftić began playing football with Bosnian club NK Jedinstvo Bihać. He moved to Croatia where he would play for NK Pula, NK Inter Zaprešić and NK Karlovac in the Prva HNL. He returned to Jedinstvo Bihać in 2009, and would move to Kuwait to play for Sahel Club in September 2010. He finished his career with Austrian side SV Wörgl.

References

1980 births
Living people
Association football defenders
Bosnia and Herzegovina footballers
NK Jedinstvo Bihać players
NK Istra 1961 players
NK Inter Zaprešić players
NK Karlovac players
SV Wörgl players
Croatian Football League players
First League of the Federation of Bosnia and Herzegovina players
Austrian Regionalliga players
Austrian Landesliga players
Bosnia and Herzegovina expatriate footballers
Expatriate footballers in Croatia
Bosnia and Herzegovina expatriate sportspeople in Croatia
Expatriate footballers in Austria
Bosnia and Herzegovina expatriate sportspeople in Austria
Al-Sahel SC (Kuwait) players
Kuwait Premier League players
Expatriate footballers in Kuwait
Bosnia and Herzegovina expatriate sportspeople in Kuwait